Six of One or Six of One, Half Dozen of the Other may refer to:

Film and television
 Six of One, an animated short film, 2000
 "Six of One" (Battlestar Galactica), a 2008 episode of the TV series
 "Six of One", a 2007 episode of children's TV series Numberjacks
 "Six of One", a 1991 episode of The Bill
 Six of One, a character in TV series Tripping the Rift
 Six of One, the TV series The Prisoner appreciation society
 Six of One, one of the original names for the TV series Friends 
 Seven of One, a 1973 British comedy series, originally to be called Six of One

Literature
 Six of One (novel), by Rita Mae Brown, 1978
 Six of One by Half a Dozen of the Other, an 1872 novel by Harriet Beecher Stowe and others
 "Six of One", a short story published in The Short Stories of F. Scott Fitzgerald, 1932
 Six of One, Half-dozen of the Other, a 2015 cartoon book by Foust

Music
 Six of One, Half-Dozen of the Other, the US version of the 1992 Marillion album A Singles Collection
 Six of One, a 1983 album by Mach One
 Six of One, a 1970 Pink Floyd bootleg recording
 Six of One, a 1980 album by Evan Parker
 Six of One, a 2019 album by David Berkman
 Six of One, a 1997 album by Enda Kenny
 Six of One, Half a Dozen of the Other, a 1967 album by Del Reeves
 Six of One, Half a Dozen of the Other, a 1996 album by Howard Werth
 Six of One, Half a Dozen of the Other: 1986–2002, a 2005 album by Snuff
 Six of One..., a box set by Squeeze that includes their first six albums expanded with bonus tracks
 Six of One..., a 2007 EP by Thunder
 "Six of One", a song by Janet Feder and Fred Frith from the 2006 album Ironic Universe
 "Six of One", a song by New Riders of the Purple Sage from the 20912 album 17 Pine Avenue
 "Six of One", a song by Gaelic Storm from the 2015 album Matching Sweaters
 "Six of One", a song by The Tear Garden from the 2000 album Crystal Mass
 "Six of One, Half a Dozen of the Other", a song by Joe Nichols from the 1996 album Joe Nichols
Six of One, Half Dozen of the Other, the title of the 2002 reissue of Joe Nichols 
 "Six of One and Half a Dozen of the Other", a song by The Ex from the 1982 album History Is What's Happening

Other uses
 Six of One, a 1964 play by Francis Essex

See also
 Irreversible binomial, a group of words used together in fixed order as an idiomatic expression, like "Six of One, Half Dozen of the Other"
 6/1 (disambiguation)